Ratchet & Clank is a platform video game developed by Insomniac Games and published by Sony Computer Entertainment for the PlayStation 2 in 2002. It is the first game in the video game series of the same name and precedes Going Commando.

The game follows the anthropomorphic character Ratchet meeting the robot Clank on his home planet, Veldin. Clank discovers that the villainous Chairman Drek of the Blarg race plans to create a new planet for his species, destroying other planets in the process. Clank convinces Ratchet to help him in his mission to secure the assistance of the famous hero Captain Qwark.

The game offers a wide range of weapons and gadgets that the player must use to defeat numerous enemies and solve puzzles on a variety of different planets in the fictional "Solana" galaxy. The game also includes several mini-games, such as racing or hacking, which the player must complete to proceed. The game was very well received by critics, who praised the graphics, gameplay, voice acting, audio, soundtrack and comedic approach to the story; some criticism was directed at the camera, the characterization of the lead characters (especially Ratchet) and the low level of difficulty in early stages.

Fourteen years later, a film based on the game was released in theaters on April 29, 2016, along with a PlayStation 4 reimagining based on that work released earlier on April 12, 2016, in North America.

Gameplay 

In Ratchet & Clank, the main playable character is Ratchet, whom the player controls from a third-person perspective, though a first-person mode to view the player's surroundings is available. The player traverses diverse environments with a large collection of unusual gadgets and weapons, using them to defeat enemies and pass obstacles. Up to 36 weapons and gadgets can be bought or found in the game.

The player begins the game with only two weapons: the "OmniWrench 8000", a standard melee weapon with a variety of uses such as interacting with puzzles in the environment, and the Bomb Glove, a short-range grenade thrower. As missions are completed across the game's various planets, more weapons and gadgets become available, including the Blaster, an automatic pistol; the Pyrocitor, a flamethrower; and the Suck Cannon, a vacuum gun, which sucks up smaller enemies and converts them into projectiles. Weapons are either found, or can be bought with bolts, the game's form of currency. The OmniWrench remains the standard melee weapon for close combat, with its own button, as all other weapons assume the role of secondary weaponry and can only be equipped one at a time, though all weapons can be carried in the player's inventory.

Bolts can be found in crates, along with ammo, or dropped from defeated enemies. The player also needs to buy ammo for most weapons, but a small number can function without the need for ammo. Vendors, which sell weapons and ammo, are situated at strategic points throughout levels. After completing the game, the player may choose to enter "challenge mode", in which the game's difficulty level rises considerably, but all bolts and weapons acquired the first time are carried through. There is also the option to buy "gold weapons", more powerful versions of existing weapons. The game's health system, Nanotech, starts at four health bubbles equivalent to be able to take four hits, but upgrades can be purchased, giving the player a total of five hit points with the first upgrade and eight hit points with the second.

Normally, Clank rides on Ratchet's back, acting as a jet-pack or similar device. Occasionally, however, Clank becomes a playable character when Ratchet is unable to explore certain areas. Clank can control "Gadgebots", smaller robots similar to Clank, who perform certain actions for him. Racing, in the form of hoverboard races, appears in the game. Some racing missions are necessary to progress in the game, while others are optional. One level of space combat and a level of flying through the air shooting tankers is also present. Mini-games that unlock doors, extend bridges, or elevate platforms appear in most levels.

Plot 
In a warbot factory on planet Quartu, a defective but intelligent robot escapes and crash-lands on Veldin, the homeworld of the mechanic Ratchet (Mikey Kelley) (a feline-like humanoid known as a Lombax). After awaking, the robot, nicknamed "Clank" (David Kaye), reveals to Ratchet that he is on a mission to stop Chairman Drek (Kevin Michael Richardson), a corrupt Blargian business tycoon who harvests inhabited planets to create a new one for his race, the Blarg, due to theirs having been overpopulated and severely polluted. However, by doing so, the selected planets are destroyed in the process. Clank offered to start Ratchet's ship using a robotic ignition system, and in exchange, Ratchet agreed to take him to the planet presented in the infobot Clank obtained from Quartu. Joining forces, the two take out several of Drek's operations one-by-one while gathering gradual information on his plans. This move enrages Drek, who launches a manhunt for the duo.

Ratchet and Clank seek to enlist the help of Captain Qwark (Jim Ward), the Solana Galaxy's most popular superhero/celebrity. Once Ratchet and Clank locate Qwark in his trailer on Planet Rilgar, they agree to meet at Qwark's private headquarters on Umbris. After surviving his obstacle course, Ratchet and Clank are betrayed by Qwark, who reveals that he was working for Drek the entire time as a highly paid spokesperson for the Chairman's new planet. Qwark leaves the duo to die in the lair of a Blargian Snagglebeast, which is easily dispatched by Ratchet. Determined on getting revenge for Qwark's deception, a bitter Ratchet liberates more Blarg-conquered planets, eventually coming across a Blargian moonbase. Qwark, attempting to make sure that the duo does not interfere in Drek's plans, engages them in a grueling space battle that ends with Qwark being shot down and Ratchet and Clank leaving in satisfaction, their vengeance finally laid to rest.

Ratchet and Clank fly to Quartu in order to find out about the Blarg's next move. Immediately after realizing that Drek intends to destroy Veldin with a planet-destroying weapon called the Deplanetizer and allow his already-completed planet to take its place of orbit, Ratchet swears revenge on Drek for his mercilessness. The Blarg and Drek are pursued to Veldin by a vengeful Ratchet, and soon a vicious battle ensues. Once the fight reaches the Deplanetizer, Drek reveals that he was the one who polluted the Blargian homeworld, and did so as an attempt to make a profit from creating and selling the artificial planet to the Blarg. He intends to repeat the whole process over-and-over again until he becomes the richest person in the galaxy. Ratchet launches Drek to his new planet, which is destroyed when Ratchet fires the Deplanetizer at it, killing Drek. Chunks of the planet begin to hit Veldin causing the duo to nearly fall to their death. Clank notes his arm to be badly damaged, but Ratchet remarks he will be fine and seems to leave the scene. A distraught Clank then turns around and begins walking away; however, Ratchet returns to take Clank home and repair him. The duo then walk home together, their bond as friends now cemented.

In a post-credits scene, Qwark advertises his "Personal Hygienator", much to Ratchet and Clank's disgust and discomfort, and Clank turns off the Holovision (TV) ending the game.

Development and release 
After finishing work on the Spyro the Dragon series on the PlayStation, Insomniac originally intended to launch a game codenamed I5 (Insomniac game #5) for the PlayStation 2. The developers, however, were never enthusiastic about it, and the idea was dropped after six months. Ratchet & Clank was based on an idea by Brian Hastings, which would feature a space-traveling reptile alien who would collect various weapons as he progressed through the game; Ratchet's final form was decided upon after Insomniac considered a space lizard with a tail and various terrestrial creatures, including dogs and rats; feline features stood out to the developers because of the associated sense of agility. Another early idea was to have three small robots attached to Ratchet, which would perform different functions. However, Insomniac realized that having the robots was both complicated and created confusion about Ratchet's appearance, leading them to have only one robot, Clank.
According to an interview, not much was cut but that (according to Insomniac) "Interestingly, we really didn't cut anything except for a few weapons and gadgets that just weren't fun when we prototyped them. There was the Revolverator – a drill gun which would spin enemies around once Ratchet impaled them and the Mackerel 1000 – basically a fish that took the place of the wrench. Both of these got cut because they were either too hard to use or just didn't add anything to the game."

Shortly after changing the game from I5 to Ratchet & Clank, Naughty Dog asked Insomniac if they would be interested in sharing the game technology used in Naughty Dog's Jak and Daxter: The Precursor Legacy, asking that Insomniac in turn share with them any improvements that were made. Insomniac agreed, resulting in most of the Ratchet & Clank engine technology being developed in-house by Insomniac, but some important renderers were developed by Naughty Dog. Looking back on the agreement, Ted Price said that "Naughty Dog's generosity gave us a huge leg up and allowed us to draw the enormous vistas in the game." Some years later, Ted Price clarified Insomniac's stance on engine technology while obliquely mentioning the shared renderers:

Pre-production of the game began in late March 2001, with a team of approximately 35 people. The game went into production in November 2001, and by the end of the project, the team had grown to 45. The game was first released in North America on November 4, 2002, and then in Australia on November 6, 2002. It was later released in PAL regions on November 8, 2002, and in Japan on December 3, 2002. In November 2003, Sony added Ratchet & Clank to their Greatest hits series of games for the PlayStation 2 when Ratchet & Clank: Going Commando was released at that time, and the game was similarly added to Sony's Platinum Range used in the PAL region on August 22, 2003. The game was added to Japan's The Best range on July 3, 2003; it was also the only game to be bundled with the PlayStation 2 in Japan.

Reception 

By July 2006, Ratchet & Clank had sold 1.1 million copies and earned $31 million in the United States. Next Generation ranked it as the 49th highest-selling game launched for the PlayStation 2, Xbox or GameCube between January 2000 and July 2006 in that country. Combined sales of the Ratchet & Clank series reached 4 million units in the United States by July 2006. As of June 30, 2007, the game sold more than 3.7 million copies worldwide.

Ratchet & Clank was met with positive reviews from critics upon release. After playing a preview of the game, GameSpot described it as having "excellent graphics, varied gameplay, and tight control[s]". The game's use of weapons, rather than simple melee attacks, was cited as one of the main features that made it stand out from other platform games; Computer and Video Games said that "Going berserk with your giant ratchet ... is seriously satisfying ... Every time you thump an enemy with the hefty tool, it looks, sounds and feels remarkably solid. ... What's more, the same can be said for all the other weapons you collect and use over the course of your intergalactic adventure". GameSpot noted that the player does not need to follow the same paths multiple times, as was common in platformers at the time. GameSpot named Ratchet & Clank the best PlayStation 2 game of November 2002; it later won the publication's annual "Best Graphics (Technical) on PlayStation 2" award, and a nomination for "Best Graphics (Artistic) on PlayStation 2". Gameplanet said that it was "Quite simply the best platform game on the PS2 right now and possibly the best on any format!"

Reviewers praised the game's graphics, specifically pointing out the character and background designs as being high-quality for PS2 games of the time. GameSpy called the graphics "mind-blowing", and GameSpot praised the game's smooth frame rate. GameZone noted the animation of Ratchet, praising the details in his animation. Reviewers found that the game's voice overs and other audio elements were generally well-done. IGN commented on the game's artificial intelligence, saying that it was not as well-done as that of Jak and Daxter: The Precursor Legacy, but still "purposefully comic and somewhat sophisticated" in others. Gameplanet felt that the game's levels were well laid-out.

Criticism was aimed at the game's camera angles, which Eurogamer felt were "idiotic" at times, giving the example of boss fights in which the camera centers on the boss rather than being freely movable. Allgame found that it was hard to form an emotional bond with Ratchet & Clanks main characters, saying that Ratchet is "your typical teenager ... who desires nothing more than excitement and adventure" and that Clank is "the stereotypical intellectual; stuffy and almost prudish to a fault", feeling instead that the characters of Jak and Daxter from Jak and Daxter: The Precursor Legacy were "infinitely more likeable." Some criticism was also aimed at the story, with GameSpy saying that the game became predictable, boring, and "just bland". Reviewers also noted that the first half of the game was "yawn inducing", but once the player reaches planet Rilgar, it becomes much more intense and difficult; GamePro found that the player does not "engage a single thought process" for the first parts of the game.

Legacy 
In June 2014, it was announced that the game would be re-imagined for the PlayStation 4, with the intention of remaking the original game as if Insomniac Games were to make the game again today.

References

External links 

 
 

Ratchet & Clank
2002 video games
3D platform games
Interactive Achievement Award winners
Video games developed in the United States
PlayStation 2 games
PlayStation 2-only games
Single-player video games
Sony Interactive Entertainment games
Insomniac Games games
Video games scored by David Bergeaud
D.I.C.E. Award for Action Game of the Year winners
D.I.C.E. Award for Adventure Game of the Year winners